Hypercompe chelifer is a moth of the family Erebidae first described by William Trowbridge Merrifield Forbes in 1929. It is found in Argentina.

References

chelifer
Moths described in 1929